Xiahou Ying (died 172 BC), posthumously known as Marquis Wen of Ruyin, was a Chinese politician who served as Minister Coachman during the early Han dynasty. He served under Liu Bang (Emperor Gaozu), the founding emperor of the Han dynasty, and fought on Liu Bang's side during the Chu–Han Contention (206–202 BC) against Liu Bang's rival, Xiang Yu. He is also sometimes referred to as the Duke of Teng in historical records.

Early life 
Xiahou Ying was from Pei County in present-day Jiangsu. He started his career as a minor officer in charge of horses, chariots and carriages in the county office. Whenever he passed by Sishui Village, one of the villages in Pei County, he would visit his friend Liu Bang, a low-ranking officer in the village, and spend a long time chatting with him.

On one occasion, Liu Bang played a prank on Xiahou Ying and caused him to be injured. The county magistrate found out about the incident and ordered an investigation. Under the law of the Qin dynasty at the time, Liu Bang would be punished more severely than a civilian because he was a village officer. Xiahou Ying lied that he had accidentally injured himself in order to protect Liu Bang, and the case was initially closed. Later, somebody reported Xiahou Ying for making a false statement so Xiahou Ying was arrested, flogged, and imprisoned for over a year. However, he still continued to cover up for Liu Bang.

Rebelling against the Qin dynasty 
In 209 BC, several rebellions broke out throughout China to overthrow the Qin dynasty. When Liu Bang also started a rebellion in Pei County, Xiahou Ying joined him and assisted him in seizing control of their home county. Liu Bang then gave himself the title "Duke of Pei", and made Xiahou Ying a seventh-grade official and appointed him as his personal carriage driver.

When Liu Bang was attacking Huling (northeast of present-day Longgu Town, Pei County, Jiangsu), Xiahou Ying and Xiao He, another of Liu Bang's followers, managed to persuade the Qin officer guarding Huling to surrender to Liu Bang. For his achievement, Xiahou Ying was promoted to a fifth-grade official.

Between 209 BC and 206 BC, Xiahou Ying joined the rebels led by Liu Bang in attacking Qin forces at various locations: Dang County, Jiyang and Yongqiu, all in present-day eastern Henan; Dong'e (present-day Liaocheng, Shandong); Puyang; Kaifeng; Luoyang; Nanyang;  Lantian; and Zhiyang (east of present-day Xi'an, Shaanxi). During battle, he was known for driving his chariot at high speed and striking at the enemy with sheer ferocity. In one battle at Kaifeng, he captured 68 enemy soldiers, received the surrender of 850 others, and obtained a box of golden seals. For his achievements, he was consecutively promoted to higher positions: zhibo; zhigui; and Duke of Teng.

After the Qin dynasty was overthrown by rebel forces in 206 BC, the former Qin Empire was divided into the Eighteen Kingdoms, each ruled by a rebel leader or surrendered Qin general. Liu Bang became the King of Han and was given a domain in the remote Bashu region (present-day Chongqing and Sichuan). He appointed Xiahou Ying as Minister Coachman and awarded him the title of Marquis of Zhaoping.

Chu–Han Contention 
From 206 BC to 202 BC, Xiahou Ying fought on Liu Bang's side against Liu Bang's rival, Xiang Yu, in a power struggle for supremacy over China historically known as the Chu–Han Contention.

Around 206 BC, Han Xin, who previously served under Xiang Yu, defected to Liu Bang's side after Xiang Yu refused to heed his suggestions. When Han Xin first joined Liu Bang, he was given a lowly position as a supply officer and his talent was hardly noticed by anyone. On one occasion, Han Xin was implicated in a capital case involving 13 others and about to be executed. At the time, Xiahou Ying was supervising the executions. When it was his turn, Han Xin looked up at Xiahou Ying and asked, "Does the King of Han not want to gain control of the Empire? Why does he execute warriors then?" Xiahou Ying sensed that Han Xin was no ordinary soldier so he released Han Xin, chatted with him and recognised his talent. He then recommended Han Xin to Xiao He, one of Liu Bang's chief advisers. Xiao He, in turn, recommended Han Xin to Liu Bang, but Liu Bang was unimpressed with Han Xin.

When Liu Bang first moved into the remote Bashu region, many men under him deserted. Disappointed that Liu Bang did not appreciate his talent, Han Xin deserted as well. When Xiao He heard about it, he left in search of Han Xin and managed to find him and bring him back. Xiahou Ying also caught up with them and, together with Xiao He, succeeded in convincing Han Xin to return to Liu Bang. This time, Liu Bang listened to Xiao He and Xiahou Ying; he appointed Han Xin as a general.

In 205 BC, Liu Bang lost to Xiang Yu at the Battle of Pengcheng and was forced to retreat. Pursued by enemy forces, he fled on a carriage with his son and daughter driven by Xiahou Ying. During their journey, Liu Bang became panicky and attempted to abandon his children so that the carriage could move faster. Each time he forced his children off the carriage, Xiahou Ying would stop and pick them up again. Liu Bang was so angry with Xiahou Ying that he threatened to kill him each time he did that. Eventually, they managed to escape from danger and Xiahou Ying delivered Liu Bang's children safely to Liu Bang's base in the Guanzhong region.

Service under Emperor Gaozu 
In 202 BC, Liu Bang ultimately defeated Xiang Yu, became the emperor of China, and established the Han dynasty. Xiahou Ying followed Liu Bang to suppress rebellions by the vassal kings throughout the emperor's reign. During the Battle of Baideng in 200 BC, Xiahou Ying helped Liu Bang escape from danger after the Han forces were defeated by the Xiongnu. The emperor also enfeoffed Xiahou Ying as the Marquis of Ruyin.

Service under Emperor Hui 
After Liu Bang's death in 195 BC, Xiahou Ying continued serving as Minister Coachman under Liu Bang's son and successor, Liu Ying (Emperor Hui), who was effectively a puppet emperor controlled by his mother, Empress Lü.

Service under Emperor Wen 
Following the end of the Lü Clan Disturbance in 180 BC, Xiahou Ying and others supported Liu Heng (Emperor Wen), another son of Liu Bang, in becoming the new emperor, thus restoring Liu Bang's clan to power again.

Death 
Xiahou Ying continued serving under Emperor Wen until his death in 172 BC. Emperor Wen granted Xiahou Ying the posthumous title "Marquis Wen".

Descendants 
Many of Xiahou Ying's descendants were active towards the end of the Han dynasty. The most prominent ones were the generals Xiahou Dun and Xiahou Yuan, who served under the warlord Cao Cao. Their descendants also served in the state of Cao Wei during the Three Kingdoms period.

References 
 Sima Qian. Records of the Grand Historian, Volume 95.
 Ban Gu et al. Book of Han, Volume 41.

Year of birth unknown
172 BC deaths
Chu–Han contention people
Han dynasty politicians from Jiangsu
People from Xuzhou